Michelle Lyons ( "lions"; born 1975 or 1976) is an American crime reporter, author, and former Public Director of Information for the Texas Department of Criminal Justice, best known for witnessing approximately 280 executions in Texas.

Early life and education 
Michelle Lyons was born 1975 or 1976 in Galveston, Texas. Her father was a reporter, while her mother was a teacher at a Sunday school, and was raised Methodist. She moved to Southern Illinois during her high school years. In 1994, she moved back to Texas to attend Texas A&M University to earn a journalism degree.

Journalism career 
Lyons began her journalism career at the age of 16, working for the local Huntsville Item as a news photographer. According to Lyons, she became desensitized to seeing car crashes and house fires on the job, which she credits with helping her process witnessing executions later in her life. By the age of 22, she was working a full-time job as a reporter.

Death penalty coverage and TDCJ spokeswoman 

Lyons first began regularly covering Texas Department of Criminal Justice (TDCJ) executions at Huntsville Unit in January 2000 (she had previously filled in for a colleague in 1998). According to herself, she felt guilty for not feeling any sympathy while she watched the executions of criminals, because she had mostly supported the death penalty. She had kept a journal from October 1998 to March 2001 to record all the executions she had seen. Reportedly, she regularly received hate emails and angry phone calls that accused her of being "cold". She would often write angry emails defending the TDCJ back. 

Michelle Lyons became a public spokesperson of the TDCJ in November 2001 after she was approached by Larry Fitzgerald, the previous spokesperson. She subsequently resigned her position at the Item to join the TDCJ. Lyons was frequently accosted or covered negatively by anti-death penalty protestors or foreign journalists.  

Lyons was promoted to Director of Public Information of TDCJ in 2006, becoming the first female Director and the youngest member of the management staff at the age of 30. She reportedly enjoyed the media attention surrounding her job.  

She was abruptly demoted in 2012 over allegations that she kept inaccurate time sheets. She resigned entirely from the TDCJ in May 2012, and filed suit, alleging sex discrimination. The lawsuit is ongoing at the appeals court as of 2021, after being initially dismissed in 2015. 

During her 2001–2012 tenure, Michelle Lyons had witnessed approximately 280 executions by lethal injection, including high profile cases such as Napoleon Beazley, Betty Lou Beets, and Shaka Sankofa. Lyons had only seen two women be executed.

Later career
As of 2014, Lyons works in the public-relations department of a Houston company.

Bibliography
Lyons has co-authored a memoir, titled Death Row: The Final Minutes, published in 2018.

Personal life 
Michelle Lyons has been married at least twice, and has at least one daughter, born in 2005. Her step-daughter was murdered in California during or after 2012.

Views on the death penalty 
Lyons changed her views surrounding the death penalty after she learned of her pregnancy in 2004 and watched the expressions of the mothers of executed criminals. She feared that she would give birth to the reincarnated spirit of an executed criminal, and would often cry after an execution. She believes the state of Texas overuses the death penalty, and stated that there are "no winners" in capital punishment.

Notes

References 

1970s births
Year of birth uncertain
Living people
People from Galveston, Texas
Texas A&M University alumni
Journalists from Texas
21st-century American journalists
21st-century American women writers